Wolanin is a surname. Notable people with the surname include:

Adam Wolanin (1919–1987), Polish American soccer forward
Christian Wolanin (born 1995), Canadian-born American ice hockey defensemen
Craig Wolanin (born  1967), American ice hockey defensemen
Whitney Wolanin (born 1990), American singer and songwriter